Carsonville is an unincorporated community located in the Elk Creek district of Grayson County in the U.S. state of Virginia.

References

Unincorporated communities in Grayson County, Virginia
Unincorporated communities in Virginia